Francisco Alejandro Moreno Merino (born 11 August 1966) is a Mexican lawyer and politician from the Institutional Revolutionary Party. From 2009 to 2012 he served as Deputy of the LXI Legislature of the Mexican Congress representing Morelos.

References

1966 births
Living people
Politicians from Morelos
20th-century Mexican lawyers
National Autonomous University of Mexico alumni
21st-century Mexican politicians
Deputies of the LXI Legislature of Mexico
Members of the Chamber of Deputies (Mexico) for Morelos